Lina Frieb, real name Karoline Frieb, married name Karoline Mühldorfer, (26 November 1845 – 27 August 1876) was a German operatic soprano.

Life 
Born in Vienna, Frieb, the daughter of the actress and singer Minona Frieb-Blumauer and the engineer Emanuel Frieb, devoted herself to the stage career and received her first dramatic lessons from her mother. She took singing lessons with choirmaster Johann Elsler in Berlin.

In 1866, she came to Berlin as a soubrette at the Staatsoper Unter den Linden, where she stayed until 1868, then sang at the Leipzig Opera for a year, and after a short but successful career as an artist, she appeared on stage for the last time on 31 May 1869.

Zerline in Fra Diavolo and Marie in Tsar and Carpenter were also excellent performances by the popular singer.

In 1872 she married the Kapellmeister Wilhelm Mühldorfer.

Frieb died in Leipzig at the age of 30.

Further reading 
 Ludwig Eisenberg: Lina Frieb. In Großes biographisches Lexikon der deutschen Bühne im XIX. Jahrhundert. Paul List publishing house, Leipzig 1903,

References

External links 
 

German operatic sopranos
Musicians from Vienna
1845 births
1876 deaths